Wang Jing (born March 26, 1988, in Sha, Fujian) is a female Chinese athletics sprinter.

Wang represented China at the 2008 Summer Olympics in Beijing competing at the 100 metres sprint. In her first round heat she placed fifth in a time of 11.87 which was not enough to advance to the second round. Together with Tao Yujia, Jiang Lan and Qin Wangping she also took part in the 4x100 metres relay. In their first round heat they placed fourth behind Jamaica, Russia and Germany. Their time of 43.78 seconds was the tenth time overall out of sixteen participating nations. With this result they failed to qualify for the final.

After winning the 100 metres title at the 11th Chinese National Games, Wang tested positive for doping. The Chinese Athletic Association banned her for four years from competition and a lifetime from the national squad.

Personal best
2006 Asian Championships - 3rd 100m

See also
List of doping cases in athletics

References

http://2008teamchina.olympic.cn/index.php/personview/personsen/609

1988 births
Living people
Athletes (track and field) at the 2008 Summer Olympics
Chinese female sprinters
Olympic athletes of China
People from Sanming
Doping cases in athletics
Asian Games medalists in athletics (track and field)
Runners from Fujian
Athletes (track and field) at the 2006 Asian Games
Asian Games gold medalists for China
Medalists at the 2006 Asian Games
Olympic female sprinters
21st-century Chinese women